A Different Christmas is the debut extended play by American singer Bryson Tiller. It was released through RCA Records on November 19, 2021. The EP features guest appearances from Kiana Ledé, Justin Bieber, Poo Bear, Tayla Parx, and Tiller's daughter, Halo. It marks the first time that Tiller has worked with any of the featured artists on the EP. Production was handled by Tiller himself, Poo Bear himself, Teddy Walton, Carter Lang, J-Louis, Cool & Dre, Emoko, Nes, the Audibles, Sasha Sirota, Oliver "Junior" Frid, and Jeff "Gitty" Gitelman. The project debuted and peaked at number 194 on the Billboard 200 for the chart week ending December 4, 2021. The EP was supported by one single, "Lonely Christmas", which features Justin Bieber and Poo Bear, and was released alongside a music video with the release of the EP.

Background and promotion
On November 10, 2021, Tiller announced the project. Within the post, he stated that it was inspired by fellow singers Justin Bieber and Ariana Grande and their Christmas music that they have released previously. The tracklist was revealed exactly a week later, on November 17, 2021. Tiller told Essence that he came up with the project when thinking about how it feels to spend Christmas alone and it is specially made for his fans who are spending the holidays by themselves. It was also inspired by past events in his personal life. While creating the project, he recalled that he thought about how it feels to spend Christmas alone, which he has done that before. His purpose of the EP is to let his fans know that they are not alone for Christmas even if they are spending it alone. He also wanted to be on different instrumentals than what he regularly sings on. All seven tracks from the EP consist of a "combination of soul samples with his patented trap-like snares [drums]". The lead and only single, "Lonely Christmas", featuring Justin Bieber and American singer-songwriter and record producer Poo Bear, was released with a music video on November 19, 2021.

Track listing

Notes
 Every track is stylized in all lowercase. For example, "Lonely Christmas" is stylized as "lonely christmas".

Personnel
Musicians

 Bryson Tiller – vocals (all tracks), songwriting (tracks 1–3, 5, 6), production (track 4)
 Teddy Walton – production (track 1), songwriting (track 1)
 Carter Lang – production (track 1), songwriting (track 1)
 J-Louis – production (track 1), songwriting (track 1)
 Anthony Newley – songwriting (track 1)
 Leslie Bricusse – songwriting (track 1)
 Ben Lusher – songwriting (track 1)
 Cool & Dre
 Cool – production (track 2), songwriting (track 2), programming (track 2)
 Dre – production (track 2), songwriting (track 2), programming (track 2)
 Michael McCary – songwriting (track 2)
 Shawn Stockman – songwriting (track 2)
 Rayshon Cobbs – songwriting (track 2)
 Kiana Ledé – vocals (track 3), songwriting (track 3)
 Ekofo – production (track 3), songwriting (track 3)
 Nes – production (track 3), songwriting (track 3)
 Walter Kent – songwriting (track 4)
 Kim Gannon – songwriting (track 4)
 Justin Bieber – vocals (track 5), songwriting (track 5)
 Poo Bear – vocals (track 5), songwriting (track 5), production (track 5)
 The Audibles
 Dominic Jordan – production (track 5), songwriting (track 5)
 Jimmy Giannos – production (track 5), songwriting (track 5)
 Sasha Sirota – production (track 5), songwriting (track 5)
 Tayla Parx – vocals (track 6), songwriting (track 6)
 Kam Parker – songwriting (track 6)
 Oliver "Junior" Frid – production (track 6), songwriting (track 6)
 Halo – vocals (track 7)
 Felix Bernard – songwriting (track 7)
 Dick Smith – songwriting (track 7)
 Jeff "Gitty" Gitelman – production (track 7), bass (track 7), guitar (track 7), piano (track 7)
 Cody Sommer – drums (track 7)
 Ian Roller-Garelick – saxophone (track 7)
 Sean Shackelford – trombone (track 7)
 John Panos – trumpet (track 7)

Technical
 Jaycen Joshua – mixing (all tracks), mastering (tracks 5, 6)
 808 Ray – miscellaneous production (track 2)
 DJ Riggins – assistant engineering (tracks 3–7)
 Jacob Richards – assistant engineering (tracks 3–7)
 Mike Seaberg – assistant engineering (tracks 3–7)
 Josh Gudwin – miscellaneous production (track 5), vocal production (track 5), recording (track 5)
 Ben Rice – miscellaneous production (track 5)

Charts

References

 

2021 debut EPs
Bryson Tiller albums
Albums produced by Cool & Dre
Albums produced by Poo Bear
Christmas EPs